ZBar is an open-source C barcode reading library with C++, Python, Perl, and Ruby bindings.  It is also implemented on Linux and Microsoft Windows as a command-line application,  and as an iPhone application.

It was originally developed at SourceForge. As the latest official release (version 0.10) was in 2009-10-27, a fork was created in March, 2017, converting it to use qt5 and libv4l, improving it to better support the Video4Linux API version 2.

Features
 Image scanning
 Real-time scanning of video streams
 C++, Python, Perl, and Ruby bindings
 Qt, GTK+, and PyGTK GUI bindings
 Recognition of EAN-13, UPC-A, UPC-E, EAN-8, Code 128, Code 39, Interleaved 2 of 5 and QR code symbologies

References

External links
 LinuxTV site where the latest version is available
 GitHub ZBar clone of the latest version
 Official site

Free software programmed in C